Party Down South (also known as The Dirty South and Dirty South) is an American reality television series that premiered January 16, 2014, on CMT. The series was created by Jersey Shore executive producer SallyAnn Salsano and 495 Productions, and has thus far been set in five different locations: Murrells Inlet, South Carolina; Athens, Georgia; Savannah, Georgia; Biloxi, Mississippi; and St. Petersburg, Florida. The latter two locations have served as the setting for Party Down South and the spinoff series Party Down South 2.

Party Down South depicts eight adults who are put together in a house for the summer. In October 2014, Party Down South was announced as CMT's highest-rated show, averaging over 930,000 viewers, which led to the making of two seasons of the spinoff show Party Down South 2.

On January 7, 2016, CMT announced that the fifth season, featuring the original Party Down South cast, will be the final season. The final season premiered on January 28, 2016, and concluded on April 14, 2016.

Production
On March 5, 2013, it was announced during CMT's annual presentation attended by Viacom's top executives in New York City that CMT would be airing several new shows, including The Dirty South, that would premiere in late 2013. On July 27, 2013, WBTW announced that The Dirty South would be filmed in Murrells Inlet, South Carolina. Some locals are against the idea, as the name "Dirty South" does not represent the area and could hurt the areas reputation, but others are in favor of the show or say they will have an open mind. The series title was later changed to its current name, Party Down South.

Season one of Party Down South was filmed in Murrells Inlet, South Carolina. In July 2013, the owner of Drunken Jack's, Al Hitchcock, was approached by 495 Productions about filming in his restaurant. Hitchcock stated that he was not opposed to the idea and thinks it would be good for the area. He consequently allowed crews inside his restaurant and placed a bid to serve as the catering company for the more than 100 crew and cast members while they were in town.

In August 2014, Wright did not show up for the second-season reunion Party Down South: The After Party and all cast members stated she was no longer in contact with them. She cited religion and her pregnancy as why she would not be returning.

Cast

Note: All ages are at the time of Season 1 filming, for the exception of Hannah "Hott Dogg" Guidry, who was 28 at the time she joined the cast in Season 3.

Episodes

Season 1 (2014)

Season 2 (2014)
The second season was originally set to be filmed in Pensacola, Florida, before the local community rejected the production over concerns of image portrayal of Pensacola Beach and wanting to "get away from the whole Redneck Riviera crap." The producers eventually settled on filming in Athens, Georgia instead.

Season 3 (2015)
Season 3 premiered on February 26, 2015. Filming took place in Biloxi, Mississippi.

Season 4 (2015)
The fourth season premiered on August 20, 2015, and concluded on October 29, 2015. Filming took place in St. Petersburg, Florida.

Season 5 (2016)
The fifth and final season premiered on January 28, 2016. Filming took place in Savannah, Georgia.

Specials

Party Down South 2

Cast

Note: All ages are at the time of Season 1 filming, for the exception of Kelsie Davenport, who was 21 at the time of Season 2.

Episodes

Season 1 (2014–15)
Season 1 premiered on November 20, 2014. Filming took place in Biloxi, Mississippi.

Season 2 (2015)
The second season, which was filmed in St. Petersburg, Florida, premiered on May 14, 2015. Cast member Magan Ladner did not be return for the second season, due to the birth of her daughter. New roommate Kelsie Davenport moved in.

Controversy and incidents
Since WBTW announced that show would be filmed in Murrells Inlet, crews from the production company had begun working on a large home called King's Krest, a 100-year-old house located on the Marshwalk. This location is intended to house the cast for about a month during the filming of the show, but word of the show has worried many locals about what the caricatured "reality" show could do to the peaceful fishing town's reputation. Local resident Warren Stedman stated "There was all this secrecy, they kept telling us it was a documentary, well no it's not. It's a reality show about a bunch of drunk 20-year-olds or whatever, coming in and pretending they're Southerners."

Many residents are upset that local officials did nothing to deter the production of a show that could have serious effects on the quiet vacation destination. Jerry Oakley, the vice chairman of the Georgetown County Council, stated "Any citizen who does not agree with the decision of the Zoning Administrator can immediately appeal it to the Board of Zoning Appeals, and that would be my suggestion to anyone who has issue with that decision." Oakley went on to point out that the county does not have the authority to stop someone from filming simply because they dislike the nature of the content.

On July 31, 2013, The Sun News reported that many locals are unhappy about Murrells Inlet being in the upcoming spotlight, especially if the show turns out to be similar to TLC's Myrtle Manor. People from Georgetown County express concern that the cast does not reflect the Southern character and hospitality for which the area is known. One resident is quoted saying "I think it is absolutely ridiculous, [and] it is humiliating. The kind of people that they are casting are not from here. We definitely have more manners than that."

Former Georgia congressman, The Dukes of Hazzard star Ben Jones has been openly critical of Party Down South since its debut and has even gone so far as to write a condemning open letter to Country Music Television and its parent company Viacom Media Networks regarding the show and its portrayal of southerners.

Legal problems
On February 23, 2014, cast member Lyle Boudreaux was arrested in Maurice, Louisiana for burglary of a vehicle. TMZ later uploaded the security camera footage that recorded Boudreaux in the act.

In April 2014, cast member Mattie Breaux had a bench warrant issued for her arrest. This was the result of her failing to appear for a pre-trial hearing from a 2012 drunk-driving arrest. She said she was participating in filming for Season 2 in Athens, Georgia at the time of the hearing.

In July 2014, cast member Ryan "Daddy" Richards was investigated by authorities in Athens, Georgia, after a woman initially told police that she had been sexually assaulted by "Daddy" after being slipped a date rape drug while partying with the cast during the filming of season 2. However, after reviewing approximately 20 hours of footage, police ultimately determined that the accusations had been proven false.

On November 15, 2014, cast member Josh Murray was arrested for DUI and driving with a suspended license in Rankin County, Mississippi, after failing a field sobriety test.

On February 8, 2015, Lyle Boudreaux was arrested again, this time in Lafayette, Louisiana, on charges of drunk driving, marijuana possession and bringing drugs into a jail following his arrest.

On October 25, 2018, Taylor Wright was arrested for punching her mother-in-law during an argument.

References

External links
 Official site at CMT.com

2010s American reality television series
2014 American television series debuts
2016 American television series endings
English-language television shows
Television shows set in South Carolina